Greta Barbara Stevenson (10 June 1911 – 18 December 1990) was a New Zealand botanist and mycologist. She described many new species of Agaricales (gilled mushrooms).

Background and education
Stevenson was born in Auckland, New Zealand, the oldest of four children of William Stevenson and his wife Grace Mary Scott. William was the managing director of the canned food manufacture Irvine and Stevenson. The Stevenson family moved to Dunedin in 1914, and Greta attended Columba College from 1925 to 1928. She later went on to the University of Otago in 1929, from which she graduated with a BSc in 1932, and then an MSc in botany with first-class honors in 1933. Her thesis was about the life history of the rare parasitic Korthalsella. After graduating she moved to London to attend the Imperial College of Science and Technology, where she completed a PhD in mycology and plant pathology. She married Edgar Cone in 1936, a research student in chemical engineering, with whom she had two children. Returning to New Zealand, while her children were young she was employed with the Wellington City Council as an analyst and a soil microbiologist for the Department of Scientific and Industrial Research soil bureau. During this time she also taught science at several secondary schools. Stevenson was an avid mountaineer, and climbed the east peak of Mount Earnslaw, then a significant accomplishment for an all-woman party.

Stevenson held several appointments: Otago University; Wellington City Council; Cawthron Institute, Nelson; Imperial College, London; Crawley College of Further Education; and King Alfred's College. Stevenson died in London on 18 December 1990, at the age of 79.

In 2017, Stevenson was selected as one of the Royal Society Te Apārangi's "150 women in 150 words", celebrating the contributions of women to knowledge in New Zealand.

Researches in mycology
Stevenson published three books on ferns and fungi, all of which were illustrated with her own drawings. She is known for her five-part series on the Agaricales of New Zealand, published in the Kew Bulletin between 1962 and 1964, in which she described over 100 new species. Her historically important private collection of New Zealand fungi were incorporated with those of Marie Taylor and Barbara Segedin to form the basis of the New Zealand Fungarium.

Eponymous taxa
Entoloma stevensoniae E.Horak (1980); a nomen novum for Entoloma niveum G. Stev. (1962)
Hygrocybe stevensoniae T.W.May & A.E.Wood (1995)

Selected works
Stevenson, G. (1946–47). The growth of a species of the genus Lilaeopsis in fresh-water reservoirs near Wellington. (PDF) Transactions and Proceedings of the Royal Society of New Zealand 76 (4):581–88.
___. (1954). A Book of Ferns. New York: Henry George Fiedler. 160 pp.
___. (1954). Nitrogen fixation by non-nodulated plants, and by nodulated Coriaria arborea. Nature 182 :1523–1524. 
___.  (1962). The Agaricales of New Zealand: I. Boletaceae and Strobilomycetaceae. Kew Bulletin 15 (3): 381–85. 
___.  (1962). The Agaricales of New Zealand: II. Kew Bulletin 16 (1): 65–74. 
___.  (1962). The Agaricales of New Zealand: III. Kew Bulletin 16 (2): 227–37. 
___.  (1963). The Agaricales of New Zealand: IV. Kew Bulletin 16 (3): 373–84. 
___.  (1964). The Agaricales of New Zealand: V. Kew Bulletin 19 (1): 1–59. 
___.  (1967). The Biology of Fungi, Bacteria and Viruses. London: Edward Arnold. 202 pp.
___.  (1982). Field Guide to Fungi. Canterbury: University of Canterbury. 122 pp. 
___.  (1978). Botanical evidence linking the New Zealand Maoris with New Caledonia and the New Hebrides. Nature 276 :704–705.

See also
List of mycologists
 :Category:Taxa named by Greta Stevenson

References

20th-century New Zealand botanists
New Zealand mycologists
New Zealand taxonomists
1911 births
1990 deaths
Women mycologists
Women taxonomists
People associated with Department of Scientific and Industrial Research (New Zealand)
People associated with the Cawthron Institute
Alumni of Imperial College London
20th-century New Zealand women scientists
New Zealand women botanists
20th-century New Zealand women writers